Renato Usatîi (born 4 November 1978) is a Moldovan politician and businessman serving as President of Our Party since 8 February 2015. He is the current mayor of Bălți after previously holding the office from July 2015 to February 2018.

Usatîi's political positions have been described as populist and anti-establishment. He participated in the 2014 Moldovan parliamentary election as a candidate on the electoral list of the political party "Patria". The party was excluded from the race three days before the election, a decision declared arbitrary by the European Court of Human Rights. Usatîi intended to participate in the 2016 Moldovan presidential election but was unable to after a decision of the Constitutional Court of Moldova changed the minimum age required for someone to serve as president from 35 to 40. He voiced the opinion that the court's decision was issued to specifically prevent him from running for president. The president of the Constitutional Court later denied the accusations. Usatîi participated in the 2020 Moldovan presidential election and came in third, securing 16.9% of the votes.

Early life and education
Renato Usatîi was born on 4 November 1978 in Fălești, Moldavian SSR, Soviet Union (now Republic of Moldova) to two English language teachers. He attended a Russian language school. In 1994 he won first place in the Republican English Language Olympiad, thanks to which he was admitted to the Faculty of Foreign Languages and Literatures of the Alecu Russo State University of Bălți, which he later graduated from.

Professional and business career
From 2000 to 2001 Usatîi worked as a supervisor at the Chișinău International Airport. Later, between 2002 and 2004 he worked as a Lead Engineer of the food production facility at the Calea Ferată din Moldova.
In 2004 Usatîi emigrates to Russia. In 2005 he co-founded ″VPT-NN″, a company producing railway equipment. From 2005 to 2015 he served as president of the company.

Political career

2014 parliamentary election
In April 2014, Usatîi was elected as the new leader of the Republican People's Party after a unanimous vote of the 248 delegates present at the fourth Congress of the party. After electing a new president, the party renamed itself to “Our Party”. On 10 June 2014, the Ministry of Justice of Moldova denied Usatîi's request to change the party's name saying that the rebranding was voted in violation of the party's internal regulations. He considered the decision politically-motivated and accused the Ministry of following the Liberal Democratic Party of Moldova's orders. In August 2014, Usatîi founded a new party named “PaRUs” (Party of Renato Usatîi) with the intention of participating in the 2014 Moldovan parliamentary election. The party was denied registration by the Ministry of Justice, which cited suspicions that around 30% of the signatures submitted had been forged.

On 30 September, Usatîi announced that he was going to participate in the 2014 parliamentary election as a candidate on the electoral list of the political party "Patria". The party was excluded from the race three days before the elections on the grounds that it used money from abroad to finance its electoral campaign. In August 2020, the European Court of Human Rights concluded that the exclusion was not based on sufficient and relevant evidence. The Court also mentioned that the decisions of the national authorities were unreasonable and arbitrary. On 27 November, Usatîi announced that he was leaving the country citing fears of imminent arrest.
In February 2015, the Republican People's Party again rebranded itself to “Our Party” and elected Usatîi as its leader. This time the changes were approved by the Ministry of Justice.

First term as Mayor of Bălți: 2015-2018
Usatîi returned to Moldova in May 2015 and decided to run for Mayor of Bălți. He won the election by a decisive margin and was inaugurated as mayor on 2 July. Under his leadership, in October 2017, the Bălți administration was declared the most transparent city administration in Moldova by the IDIS-Viitorul Institute and the Slovakian Institute for Economic and Social Reforms „INEKO”.

In October 2016, a national and international arrest warrant was issued by a Moldovan Court for Usatîi. In September 2016, Usatîi left the country for Russia and remained there until the 2019 Moldovan constitutional crisis and the inauguration of the Sandu Cabinet.

2015-2016 protests
Renato Usatîi and Our Party actively participated in the organization of the 2015–2016 protests in Moldova. In September 2015, Usatîi, along with Igor Dodon, set up a tent encampment in front of the Parliament building calling it „Victory City”. During that time, Usatîi also posted multiple videos encouraging people to participate in the antigovernmental protests.

2016 presidential election
In the summer of 2016, Usatîi said that Vlad Plahotniuc offered him $1.5 million in exchange for him ceasing any involvement in Moldovan politics until the presidential election and an even larger sum in exchange for him quitting politics altogether. He added that Plahotniuc wanted him to resign from his position as mayor of Bălți and leader of „Our Party” and that he refused the offer.
An opinion poll conducted on behalf of the International Republican Institute showed Usatîi receiving 20% of the votes and coming in first in the first round. As a result of a decision of the Constitutional Court of Moldova from March 2016, the minimum age required for someone to serve as president was changed from 35 to 40. The decision rendered Usatîi unable to participate in the presidential elections as he was only 37 at the time. He voiced the opinion that the court's decision was issued to specifically prevent him from running for president. The president of the Constitutional Court later denied the accusations.
In the first round of the election, Usatîi supported „Our Party” candidate Dumitru Ciubaşenco. In the second round he endorsed Igor Dodon.

Second term as Mayor of Bălți: 2019-2021
Usatîi returned to Moldova in June 2019 following the inauguration of the Sandu Cabinet. In October 2019 he decisively won the Bălți mayoral election by securing 64.46% of the votes in the first round. In July 2020, the Bălți city administration was declared the most transparent city administration nationwide for the fourth year in a row by the IDIS-Viitorul Institute and the Slovakian Institute for Economic and Social Reforms „INEKO”. 
In September 2020, Usatîi suspended his activities as mayor of Bălți in order to participate in the 2020 Moldovan presidential election

2020 presidential election
In July 2020 Usatîi announced that he wanted the people to decide whether he should run for president in 2020. During a press conference, he asked people to record short videos in which they would express their views on his potential candidacy and send them to him before 27 August 2020. On 26 August 2020, Usatîi posted a YouTube compilation video with people expressing support for his candidacy and claimed that tens of thousands of people asked him to run for president. The next day, Usatîi organized an open air press conference during which he officially announced his candidacy for the 2020 elections.

Usatîi's campaign emphasized several priorities, including organizing snap parliamentary elections, eradicating corruption by forming a Moldovan equivalent of Mossad, abolishing district authorities and intensifying economic cooperation with Romania and Ukraine. He also heavily criticized incumbent president Igor Dodon, accusing him of spending a week in a luxury resort financed by taxpayer money, fabricating opinion polls, illegally spying on his campaign and attempting to rig the election by paying Moldovan citizens from Transnistria to vote for him.
He came in third in the first round securing 16.9% of the votes. After his elimination in the first round, Usatîi advised his supporters to vote against Dodon in the second round but did not specifically endorse Sandu.

2021 snap parliamentary elections 
After the Constitutional Court of Moldova declared the emergency state unconstitutional on 28 April 2021, later that day Maia Sandu signed the decree of dissolution of the Parliament and the snap elections on July 11, 2021. Renato Usatîi announced on 5 May the electoral bloc with his name, formed between Our Party and Patria Party. After the elections, Electoral Bloc Renato Usatîi got 4,1% of votes (7% threshold) and did not acced in the Parliament. In Bălți, the electoral bloc gained the 3rd place (after BECS and PAS). On July 12, Renato Usatîi announced he will resign as Mayor of Bălți.

Controversies

Phone tampering allegations
On 23 October 2015, Usatîi was arrested in Chișinău and charged with illegal tampering of Vlad Filat's phone, the former prime-minister who himself was arrested for corruption charges. Usatîi confessed he indeed published the phone records but that he thought it was a necessary measure in order to save the country from corruption. On 25 October he was released; the charges were not dismissed.

German Gorbuntsov  case

Case
In 2012, German Gorbuntsov survived an unsuccessful attempt on his life in central London. In October 2016 an arrest warrant was issued for Usatîi for the alleged assassination attempt of Gorbuntsov. Usatîi denied the accusations saying that the charges were politically motivated.

Interpol decision 
In June 2018, the Interpol decided to remove Usatîi's case from their database and remove him from the wanted list. It decided that the charges brought against Usatîi were largely politically motivated and that keeping disputed data in their database could have a negative impact on the Interpol's politically neutral stance.

References

1978 births
Living people
Moldovan businesspeople
Our Party (Moldova) politicians
People from Fălești District
Moldovan philanthropists